Burley Griffin Way is a New South Wales state route, is located in south eastern Australia. Named after the American architect Walter Burley Griffin, designer of the cities of Canberra and Griffith, the road links these two cities via Yass and Barton Highway.

Route
Burley Griffin Way commences at the intersection of Irrigation Way at Yoogali, in the eastern suburbs of Griffith, and heads in an easterly direction, passing through the regional towns of Yenda and Barellan, before meeting Newell Highway at Ardlethan. It recommences at Beckom, running east and crossing Goldfields Way through Temora, Olympic Highway at Wallendbeen, continues through Harden and eventually ends at the at-grade interchange with Hume Highway west of Bowning.

Economically it provides a link between the agricultural produce of the western Riverina and Murrumbidgee regions and markets such as Sydney. The area it passes through is one of the richest agricultural areas in Australia. Hence, trucks make up a significant proportion of traffic using the road.

Some sections of Burley Griffin Way are dangerous, there have been numerous major accidents.

Numerous major accidents still occurring on the Burley Griffin Way. More prone at level crossings, sharp corners and steep hills. Despite upgrades on the worse sections

History
The passing of the Main Roads Act of 1924 through the Parliament of New South Wales provided for the declaration of Main Roads, roads partially funded by the State government through the Main Roads Board (later the Department of Main Roads, and eventually Transport for NSW). With the subsequent passing of the Main Roads (Amendment) Act of 1929 to provide for additional declarations of State Highways and Trunk Roads, the Department of Main Roads (having succeeded the MRB in 1932) declared Main Road 387 on 24 August 1938, from the intersection with Main Road 254 in Yenda via Barellan to the intersection with State Highway 17 (later Newell Highway) at Ardlethan, then from the intersection from State Highway 17 at Beckom via Temora, Wallendbeen and Harden to the intersection with Hume Highway) in Bowning.

Trunk Road 84 was declared on 24 August 1949, from the intersection with Trunk Road 57 (later Goldfields Way) in Temora via Wallendbeen and Harden to the intersection with Hume Highway) in Bowning, subsuming the alignment of Main Road 387 between Temora and Bowning; Main Road 387 was truncated at Temora as a result.

The passing of the Roads Act of 1993 updated road classifications and the way they could be declared within New South Wales. Under this act, the western end of Main Road 84 (previously Trunk Road 84) was extended to from Temora via Ardlethan, Barellan, Yenda and Yoolgali, subsuming Main Road 387 and a portion of Main Road 254 (which was truncated to meet Main Road 84 at Yenda), and the route was also officially named as Burley Griffith Way, on 2 August 1996. Burley Griffith Way today retains its declaration as Main Road 84.

The route was allocated State Route 94 in 1974. With the conversion to the newer alphanumeric system in 2013, this was replaced with route B94.

In 2007 a bypass was constructed west of Bowning, and Burley Griffin Way was realigned along this road to a new at-grade intersection with Hume Highway. However this intersection can be covered in thick fog in winter, potentially causing accidents for traffic attempting to cross the high-speed dual carriageways of Hume Highway. The area is prone to fog and already had a reputation as a black spot, despite the intersection being opened back in 2007.

Wallendbeen Bridge

Burley Griffin way is closed between Stockinbingal and Wallendbeen due to a bridge failure at Wallendbeen. Cootamundra-Gundagai Regional Council said it could take up to 18 months for a new bridge after the Wallendbeen Rail Road Bridge was damaged. The bridge has been demolished and waiting for new bridge.

A Transport for NSW spokesperson said planning for a replacement is under way and the first task is to finalise both a temporary and a permanent solution.  The spokesperson said the advice of the community would be sought. The temporary bridge is in place where the old bridge was and it has been opened at the end of October 2021.

A temporary bridge at Wallendbeen will commence construction shortly, allowing Burley Griffin Way to reopen and end the detour which is costing drivers an extra 40 minutes. The bridge will provide a temporary solution for motorists to access Burley Griffin Way while a permanent solution is planned and built.

Work at Wallendbeen set to start
The previous overbridge was damaged by heavy rain in March and had to be demolished, creating a 40 minute detour for motorists. A replacement structure, composed of pre-fabricated parts, will be installed on-site, over a period of about three months – a fraction of the time it would take to build a permanent crossing. It will be a temporary single-lane, pre-fabricated structure that will allow traffic over this section of the Burley Griffin Way and cut out the need for a 40 minute detour.

Transport for NSW expects the bridge to be open by September and they are working on designing and planning for a new, permanent structure that will meet the needs of everyone who uses this road. 

Burley Griffin Way will remain closed at the railway line and motorists should continue to use the detour via the Olympic Highway and Goldfields Way.

Major intersections

See also

 Highways in Australia
 List of highways in New South Wales

References

Highways in New South Wales